The 1963 Idaho Vandals football team represented the University of Idaho in the 1963 NCAA University Division football season. The Vandals were led by second-year head coach Dee Andros and were an independent in the NCAA's University Division. Three home games were played on campus at Neale Stadium in Moscow, with one in Boise at old Bronco Stadium at Boise Junior College.

Season
Led on the field by quarterbacks Gary Mires and Mike Monahan, Idaho compiled a  record for the program's first winning season in a quarter century, since 1938 under head coach Ted Bank. In between, Idaho had three seasons at an even .500, (1947, 1952, 1957). The victory over Fresno State was their first in a season opener in thirteen years. All five Vandal wins came in Idaho, played in three different regions of the state.

Although a slight favorite, the Vandals suffered a ninth straight loss in the Battle of the Palouse with neighbor Washington State, falling  at Rogers Field in Pullman on November 2. The difference was a fourth quarter Cougar touchdown on a kickoff return. The rivalry game with Montana for the Little Brown Stein was not played this year or the next.

This was the second season (1959) in which Idaho scheduled ten games, but the finale at Arizona State in Tempe on November 23 was canceled following the assassination of President Kennedy. Although many teams postponed their games for a week, ASU had its rivalry game scheduled for November 30 against Arizona, so the  game was not played.

Idaho was a charter member of the new Big Sky Conference, but did not participate in football until 1965, and was an independent from 1959 through 1964. The only Big Sky opponent on the Vandals' schedule in 1963 was conference champion , whom they shut out on the road in Pocatello; the remainder of Idaho's opponents were in the University Division.

Senior guard Don Matthews went on to a successful coaching career in the Canadian Football League; he was a head coach for over twenty seasons and won five of nine Grey Cup games.

Schedule

Final game was canceled following the assassination of President Kennedy.

All-Coast
No Vandals were selected to the All-Coast teams.

References

External links
Gem of the Mountains: 1964 University of Idaho yearbook – 1963 football season
Go Mighty Vandals – 1963 football season
Game program: Utah vs. Idaho at Boise – September 28, 1963
Game program: Idaho at Washington State – November 2, 1963
Idaho Argonaut – student newspaper – 1963 editions

Idaho
Idaho Vandals football seasons
Idaho Vandals football